Robert Poëti (born 13 August 1955) is a Canadian politician and former police officer of the Sûreté du Québec, currently representing the riding of Marguerite-Bourgeoys in the National Assembly of Quebec. A member of the Quebec Liberal Party caucus, he was first elected in the 2012 election.

References

External links
 

1955 births
Living people
Members of the Executive Council of Quebec
Politicians from Montreal
Quebec Liberal Party MNAs
Canadian people of Italian descent
21st-century Canadian politicians